The Malcolm Baldrige National Quality Award recognizes U.S. organizations in the business, health care, education, and nonprofit sectors for performance excellence. The Baldrige Award is the highest formal recognition of the performance excellence of both public and private U.S. organizations given by the President of the United States. It is administered by the Baldrige Performance Excellence Program, which is based at and managed by the National Institute of Standards and Technology (NIST), an agency of the U.S. Department of Commerce.

The Baldrige Performance Excellence Program and the associated award were established by the Malcolm Baldrige National Quality Improvement Act of 1987 (Public Law 100–107). The program and award were named for Malcolm Baldrige, who served as United States Secretary of Commerce during the Reagan administration, from 1981 until Baldrige's 1987 death in a rodeo accident. The first award was given November 13, 1988.  By 1991, The New York Times opinionated that the criteria should be broader and "tougher to win." In 2010, the program's name was changed to the Baldrige Performance Excellence Program.

The award is not given for specific products or services.

Baldrige Excellence Framework

Overview
The Baldrige Excellence Framework has three parts: the Criteria for Performance Excellence, core values and concepts, and scoring guidelines. The framework serves two main purposes: (1) to help organizations assess their improvement efforts, diagnose their overall performance management system, and identify their strengths and opportunities for improvement and (2) to identify Baldrige Award recipients that will serve as role models for other organizations. In addition, the framework and its Criteria help strengthen U.S. competitiveness by
•	improving organizational performance practices, capabilities, and results
•	facilitating communication and sharing of information on best practices among U.S. organizations of all types
•	serving as a tool for understanding and managing performance and for guiding planning and opportunities for learning
•	
The framework provide organizations with an integrated approach to performance management that results in
•	delivery of ever-improving value to customers and stakeholders, contributing to organizational sustainability
•	improved organizational effectiveness and capabilities
•	organizational and personal learning

The following three sector-specific versions of the Baldrige framework are revised every two years:
 Baldrige Excellence Framework (Business/Nonprofit)
 Baldrige Excellence Framework (Education)
 Baldrige Excellence Framework (Health Care)

Framework details
The framework provides organizations with an integrated approach to performance management that results in delivery of ever-improving value to customers and stakeholders, contributing to organizational sustainability improved organizational effectiveness and capabilities
organizational and personal learning

The criteria for performance excellence are based on a set of core values:

The questions that make up the criteria represent seven aspects of organizational management and performance:

History of the Baldrige Program
In the early and mid-1980s, many U.S. industry and government leaders saw that a renewed emphasis on quality was necessary for doing business in an expanding and competitive world market.

The Malcolm Baldrige National Quality Improvement Act of 1987, signed into law on August 20, 1987, was developed through the actions of the National Productivity Advisory Committee, chaired by Jack Grayson. The nonprofit research organization APQC, founded by Grayson, organized the first White House Conference on Productivity, spearheading the creation of the Malcolm Baldrige National Quality Award in 1987. The Baldrige Award was envisioned as a standard of excellence that would help U.S. organizations achieve competitive quality.

In the late summer and fall of 1987, Dr. Curt Reimann, the first director of the Malcolm Baldrige National Quality Program, and his staff at the National Institute of Standards and Technology developed an award implementation framework, including an evaluation scheme, and advanced proposals for what is now the Baldrige Award. In its first three years, the Baldrige Award was jointly administered by APQC and the American Society for Quality, which continues to assist in administering the award program under contract to NIST.

Up to 18 awards may be given annually across six eligibility categories—manufacturing, service, small business, education, health care, and nonprofit. As of 2016, 113 awards have been presented to 106 organizations (including seven repeat winners).

Program impacts
 The ratio of Baldrige Program benefits for the U.S. economy to program costs has been estimated at 820 to 1
 A New York Times-generated investment portfolio composed of Baldrige awardees "beat the S.& P. by nearly 4 to 1."
 Median growth in revenue for two-time Baldrige Award winners is 92%. 
 Median job growth for two-time Baldrige Award winners is 63% (compared with 2.5% for a matched set of industries and time periods).
 2010–2015 Baldrige Award applicants represent 567,434 jobs, over $142 billion in revenue/budgets, and about 449 million customers served.
 The value of services donated in 2015
 by 349 national Baldrige examiners was $5.3 million.
 by state Baldrige-based examiners was $30 million.
 A 2013 study by Truven Health Analytics linked hospitals that adopt and use the Baldrige Criteria to successful operations, management practices, and overall performance.
 According to survey results reported in Futurescan 2013, by 2018, 65% of hospitals are likely to "use the Baldrige Criteria for Performance Excellence as a systematic framework for performance improvement or as an internal assessment tool" 
According to the same survey, 41% of hospitals were then considered likely to submit an application for the Baldrige Award or a state-level Baldrige-based award by 2018.

Public-private partnership
The Baldrige Award is supported by a public-private partnership. The following organizations and entities play a key role:
 The Foundation for the Malcolm Baldrige National Quality Award raises funds to permanently endow the award program.
 The National Institute of Standards and Technology (NIST), an agency of the U.S. Department of Commerce, manages the Baldrige Program.
 The American Society for Quality (ASQ) assists in administering the award program under contract to NIST.
 The Board of Overseers advises the Department of Commerce on the Baldrige Program.
 Members of the Board of Examiners—consisting of leading experts from U.S. businesses and education, health care, and nonprofit organizations—volunteer their time to evaluate award applications and prepare feedback reports for applicant organizations. Board members also share information about the program in their professional, trade, community, and state organizations. The Panel of Judges, part of the Board of Examiners, makes award recommendations to the director of NIST.
 The network of state, regional, and local Baldrige-based award programs known as the Alliance for Performance Excellence provides potential award applicants and examiners, promotes the use of the Criteria, and disseminates information on the award process and concepts.
 The ISSA, the professional association for cybersecurity, is in formal partnership with the Baldrige Alliance for Performance Excellence. The Alliance and the ISSA offer a free Baldrige-based self-assessment of cybersecurity operations. It may be found at ManageHub
 Award recipients share information on their successful performance and quality strategies with other U.S. organizations.

Baldrige Award Recipients

See also
President's Quality Award
Excellence in Missouri Foundation – State level Baldrige-based award program for the State of Missouri
The Partnership for Excellence – State level Baldrige-based award program for the States of Ohio, Indiana, and West Virginia
List of national quality awards
Total Quality Management

References

External links

1987 establishments in Washington, D.C.
Awards established in 1987
American awards
Quality awards
1987 establishments in the United States
National Institute of Standards and Technology